The 1936–37 season was Union Sportive Musulmane Blidéenne's 4nd season in existence. The club played in the Third Division for the 3nd season French colonial era, as well as the North African Cup.

Competitions

League table

Overview

Third Division

Matches

Play-off

Third Division title

Classification match

Promotion

North African Cup

References

External links
La Presse libre (Alger)
L'Indépendant
L'Echo d'Alger
Le Tell

USM Blida seasons
Algerian football clubs 1936–37 season